The World Rugby Junior Player of the Year is an accolade awarded annually by the World Rugby. It is awarded to the player of the tournament in that year's World Rugby Under 20 Championship. It replaces the now defunct U21 Player of the Year and the U19 Player of the Year.  From 2008 until 2013, it was the IRB Junior Player of the Year. Since 2014, following the International Rugby Board becoming World Rugby, the award has been titled the World Rugby Junior Player of the Year.

List of Winners and Nominees

Other IRB Awards

References

External links
 Official World Rugby Awards website

Play